Punk was a Punk and Ska radio station on Sirius Satellite Radio channel 29 and Dish Network channel 6029. In its time it rivaled Fungus 53 on XM Satellite Radio.  It was added to Sirius Canada on June 24, 2008.

On September 19, 2006, following the merger of Sirius and XM, both Punk and Fungus were approved. To the dismay of many customers, both channels were replaced with a 24-hour AC/DC channel.

See also
 List of Sirius Satellite Radio stations

References

External links
 Sirius Punk

Defunct radio stations in the United States
Radio stations established in 2002
Radio stations disestablished in 2006